Man Alive is the debut studio album by British band Everything Everything. Recorded in various studios across England and Wales between 2008 and 2010 with producer David Kosten, it was released on 27 August 2010 in the United Kingdom through Geffen Records. The album peaked at number 17 on the UK Albums Chart. The songs "Suffragette Suffragette", "Photoshop Handsome", "MY KZ, UR BF" and "Schoolin'" were released as singles between 2008 and 2010, though the first three were re-recorded for the album.

The songs on Man Alive draw from a wide variety of styles, such as math rock, R&B, hip hop, electronica, baroque, and choral music, with overtly detailed lyrics sung by Jonathan Higgs in a rhythmic, falsetto style. Several of the songs originated as demos made by Higgs on his laptop, which were refined and expanded upon in the studio, though some tracks simply remixed Higgs' demos.

The album was received well by critics, and placed highly on year-end "best of" lists; British magazine The Fly declared it the fifth-best album of 2010, while NME placed it at number 43. It and its tracks were nominated for two Ivor Novello Awards, and the album was also nominated for the 2011 Mercury Prize. Critics praised the album for its originality and versatility, whilst others felt it lacked a clear direction and found the complexity of the material difficult to follow.

Recording and production
The majority of Man Alive was recorded at Bryn Derwen Studios, a small residential studio in Bethesda, Gwynedd, Wales. The band recorded songs originally developed over a two-year period in two-week stints. The band brought David Kosten on board to produce after previously working together on the "MY KZ, UR BF" single in 2009, which was received positively. These sessions were the first to feature guitarist Alex Robertshaw, who stepped in to replace Alex Niven after he left the band to resume his studies.

Promotion and release

The album's cover art, depicting an urban red fox, is based on a photograph by Swiss photographer Laurent Geslin. Additional photography on the album art was contributed by Paul Cecil.

The album was released on 27 August 2010 through Geffen Records in the United Kingdom. Higgs told the NME that the band chose the title from the lyrics on the record, and that they briefly toyed with "Taj Mahal" as a potential title. To commemorate the release, they played a small show at The Barfly in Camden Town dressed in white boilersuits, which the NME likened to the uniform of the anarchist group the WOMBLES.

Critical reception
{{Album reviews

| MC = 72/100

| rev1 = BBC
| rev1score = (very positive)
| rev2 = Drowned in Sound
| rev2score = 
| rev3 = The Fly
| rev3score = 
| rev4 = The Guardian
| rev4score = 
| rev5 = musicOMH
| rev5score = 
| rev6 = NME| rev6score = 
| rev7 = Pitchfork| rev7score = 3.8/10
}}

Aggregating website Metacritic reported a normalised rating of 72 out of 100, based on eight reviews, indicating "generally positive" reception. Reviewers generally praised the album's eccentricity; BBC Music's Alix Buscovic commented that "[Everything Everything] know more than most how to craft a song, how to make an album. They know how to give it depth, light and dark, and they – crucially – know when to stop."

Other reviewers criticised the album for its pretentiousness. Giving the album 3.8 out of ten, Ian Cohen of Pitchfork argued the album filled a niche that "was unoccupied for good reason", comparing its sound to "what would happen if Dismemberment Plan got a crash course in Pro Tools and a record deal with Fueled By Ramen".Man Alive was nominated for the Ivor Novello Award for "Best Album", while the single "My Kz, Ur Bf" received a nomination for "Best Song Musically and Lyrically". The album was also nominated for the 2011 Mercury Prize, though this was ultimately won by PJ Harvey's Let England Shake.

Track listing
All tracks written by Higgs, Pritchard and Spearman. Additional writers are present in the writer(s) column below.

Personnel
Adapted from the Man Alive'' liner notes.

Everything Everything

 Jonathan Higgs – vocals, guitar, keyboards, programming
 Jeremy Pritchard – bass guitar, backing vocals, keyboards
 Alex Robertshaw – guitar, backing vocals, programming, keyboards
 Michael Spearman – drums, percussion, backing vocals, keyboards
 Alex Niven – guitar, backing vocals (track: 1, 10)

Additional performers
 Charles Robertshaw – saxophone (track 3)
 Matt Roberts – trumpet (track 9)

Artwork
 Laurent Geslin – album cover photography
 Paul Cecil – liner notes photography
 Tappin Gofton – design, digital imaging

Production

 David Kosten – production, mixing (tracks: 4, 5, 7, 10, 11)
 Lexxx – engineering (tracks: 2, 9), additional recording (tracks: 2, 9)
 Mark Eastwood – engineering (tracks: 1, 10)
 Everything Everything – recording, production, engineering (tracks: 2, 4)
 Metropolis Mastering – mastering
 John Davies – mastering engineer (track 3)
 Adrian Bushby – mixing (tracks: 1–3, 6, 9, 12)
 Childbirth – additional production, recording (tracks: 4, 7, 11)
 Daniel Rejmer – recording (tracks: 2, 9)
 David Wrench – recording

Charts

Release history

References

2010 debut albums
Everything Everything albums